Who Killed Palomino Molero? is a 1986 novel by Peruvian novelist Mario Vargas Llosa. 

The book begins with the discovery of the brutally murdered body of a young recruit, Palomino Molero, from a nearby military base in northern Peru.  Vargas Llosa uses the structure of a murder mystery to examine the darker side of human nature, corruption, and class prejudice in Peru of the 1950s.

Death in the Andes follows the character of policeman Lituma.

References

1986 novels
Novels by Mario Vargas Llosa
Crime novels
Novels about the military
Novels set in Peru
Novels set in the 1950s
Seix Barral books